Conor McBride (born 18 February 1973) is a Reader in the department of Computer and Information Sciences at the University of Strathclyde. In 1999, he completed a Doctor of Philosophy (Ph.D.) in Dependently Typed Functional Programs and their Proofs at the University of Edinburgh for his work in type theory. He formerly worked at Durham University and briefly at Royal Holloway, University of London before joining the academic staff at the University of Strathclyde.

He was involved with developing international standards in programming and informatics, as a member of the International Federation for Information Processing (IFIP) IFIP Working Group 2.1 on Algorithmic Languages and Calculi, which specified, maintains, and supports the programming languages ALGOL 60 and ALGOL 68.

He favors and often uses the language Haskell.

Research
His most notable research is in the field of type theory. He cocreated the programming language Epigram with James McKinna. Several of his articles, including the joint-written article defining the Epigram language, have been published in the Journal of Functional Programming.

Selected bibliography

Video lectures

References

External links
 , University of Strathclyde
 , personal
 
 

Living people
British computer scientists
Academics of the University of Strathclyde
Alumni of the University of Edinburgh
1973 births